Pleșu River may refer to:

 Pleșu, a tributary of the Priboiasa in Vâlcea County
 Pleșu, a tributary of the Jaleș in Gorj County
 Pleșu, a tributary of the Teleajen in Prahova County